Bishop Road Primary School is a primary school in Bristol, England. It is on Bishop Road in the Bishopston area of Bristol. The school opened in 1896. It is the largest primary school in Bristol, notable for having educated Cary Grant and Paul Dirac. The headteacher is Gillian Powe.

References

Educational institutions established in 1896
1896 establishments in England
Primary schools in Bristol
Community schools in Bristol